Hattie Ellis is a foodwriter and journalist.    

Early Life and Career: Trained as a journalist [with Westminster Press] as a cook at [Leith's Cookery School]. 

Employment: Reporter on The Bath Evening Chronicle; BBC Food & Drink programme (researcher), Assoc. Producer "A Cook on the Wild Side".  Interests vary from the life of honey-bees to practical food politics.  Recipient of food book of the year 2013 for What to Eat?.  Her book Spoonfuls of Honey was shortlisted for the Andre Simon foodwriting awards in 2013.

Books
 Spoonfuls of Honey
 What to Eat?
 Planet Chicken
 Sweetness & Light
 Best of British Fish
 A Passion for Tea
 A Passion for Coffee
 Eating England
 Trading Places
 Mood Food

References

food writers
Year of birth missing (living people)
Living people